Gunlok is a squad based action-adventure real-time strategy video game developed by Rebellion Developments, originally released in 2000-2001. It was re-released in 2009 on GamersGate.

Plot
Set in a post apocalyptic earth, robots have almost completely wiped out mankind. However, a few pockets of human resistance fight on. Gunlok, a warrior in modular power armor powered by energy from Earth's core, fights on. As a member of Earth's elite Special Forces, Gunlok leads a campaign against the massive robot army.

Reception

The game received mixed reviews. GameSpots Scott Osborne praised the game's controls and interface, but criticized the plot and graphics.

References

External links

2000 video games
Windows games
Windows-only games
Real-time tactics video games
Role-playing video games
Multiplayer video games
Post-apocalyptic video games
Rebellion Developments games
Virgin Interactive games
Cyberpunk video games
Video games developed in the United Kingdom